Brima Dawson Kuyateh is a Sierra Leonean journalist who once served as the president of the Sierra Leone Reporters Union.

External links

Year of birth missing (living people)
Living people
Sierra Leonean journalists
Place of birth missing (living people)